The Columbiettes are women members of auxiliary council affiliated with a local Knights of Columbus council.

History
In 1939, Monsignor J. Francis McIntyre, Chaplain of the New York Chapter Knights of Columbus, later a cardinal, suggested formation of the group.  He conceived the idea of a ladies organization to work with the Knights of Columbus (KofC). The New York Chapter KofC formulated a plan for such an organization. Their plan called for the establishment of Auxiliaries in each Council and to coordinate the efforts of all under the direction of one parent group. On March 2, 1939 the first Columbiette Auxiliary was instituted in New York City.

Since then, other auxiliaries were formed. A Supreme Council and State Councils were established.

Purpose

Spiritual patronesses are the Blessed Virgin Mary, Thérèse of Lisieux and St. Joan of Arc.

A Columbiette Auxiliary must be sponsored by a Knights of Columbus Council. The primary requirements to be a member of this organization is to be a Catholic female in good standing with the Church and to be 18 years of age or older.  The purpose is to aid that Knights Council in their spiritual and social activities when asked.  The Columbiette Auxiliary has its own activities; spiritual, social and charitable welfare  of their members, etc.

See also
 Catholic Daughters of the Americas
 Daughters of Isabella

References

External links 
 The Columbiettes Official Website  
 A Knights of Columbus Chapter Website Describing the Columbiettes
 A Columbiettes auxiliary homepage

Christian organizations established in 1939
Knights of Columbus
Organizations based in New York City
Women's organizations based in the United States
Mineola, New York
Christian women's organizations
1939 establishments in New York (state)